The Modern Humanities Research Association (MHRA) is a United Kingdom–based international organisation that aims to encourage and promote advanced study and research of humanities. It is most notable for producing the MHRA Style Guide.

History
The MHRA was founded in 1918 in Christ's College, Cambridge. After an early change of name to MHRA in 1918, the unincorporated charity became an incorporated company with the same name on 2 October 1997. Its declared aim is to encourage and promote advanced study and research in the field of the modern humanities, which include the modern and medieval European languages, literatures and cultures. The current president is Dame Gillian Beer of Cambridge.

Publications
As well as the MHRA Style Guide, the MHRA publishes seven scholarly journals: 
 Annual Bibliography of English Language and Literature
 Modern Language Review
 Austrian Studies
 Portuguese Studies
 The Slavonic and East European Review
 The Yearbook of English Studies
 The Year's Work in Modern Language Studies

and book series:
 Legenda (imprint)
 Publications of the MHRA
 MHRA Texts & Dissertations
 MHRA Bibliographies
 MHRA Critical Texts
 MHRA European Translations
 MHRA New Translations
 MHRA Tudor & Stuart Translations

Directors
Andrew Gurr: 1987 to 1997
Nicola Bradbury: 1998 to 2005

Further reading 
 Wells, David A. 2003. "The Modern Humanities Research Associations (MHRA)". Diogenes 50 (2): 130-135.

Notes

External links

Learned societies of the United Kingdom
Publications established in 1918
1918 establishments in England